Toji may refer to;

Marcus Toji, American actor (born 1984)
Toji (novel), a saga novel written by Pak Kyongni
The Land (1974 film), a 1974 South Korean film
Toji, the Land (2004 TV series), a 2004 South Korean drama
Alternative spelling for Tōji